John Lauris Blake (December 21, 1788 – July 6, 1857) was an American clergyman and bestselling author. He is best known as the author of the General Biographical Dictionary.

Life

He was born on 21 December 1788 in Northwood, New Hampshire. During his adolescence he practiced cabinet making and at the same time prepared himself for college. He graduated from Brown University in 1812, and was licensed as a Congregational minister in 1813.

Blake was the founder of the Ladies' Magazine, headmaster of the Cornhill School for Young Ladies, and served on the committee of Boston public schools.

Blake was elected a member of the American Antiquarian Society in 1815.  A significant number original 19th century copies of works authored by Blake are held in the collections of the AAS.

Bibliography

Blake was an editor of the Literary Advertiser and the Gospel Advocate. His published books include:

 A Text Book of Geography and Chronology (1814)
 Anecdotes of American Indians (1835)
 The Wonders of Art; Containing An Account of Celebrated Ancient Ruins; Fortifications; Public Edifices; Monuments; and some of The Most Curious and Useful Inventions in Modern Times (1845)
 A General Biographical Dictionary (1835, 13th ed., 1856)
 The Parlor Book or Family Encyclopædia of Useful Knowledge and General Literature (1837)
 Farm and Fireside (1852)
 Farmer's Every Day Book (1852)
 Evidences of Christianity (1852)
 Modern Farmer (1853)
 A Cyclopædia of Modern Agriculture (1856)

See also
 John L. Blake

References

External links
history50states.com

1788 births
1858 deaths
People from Northwood, New Hampshire
American Congregationalist ministers
American non-fiction writers
Members of the American Antiquarian Society
American male non-fiction writers
19th-century American writers
19th-century American male writers